The Cessna Airmaster, is a family of single-engined aircraft manufactured by the Cessna Aircraft Company. The Airmaster played an important role in the revitalization of Cessna in the 1930s after the crash of the aviation industry during the Great Depression.

Development

Initial model

In the mid-1930s, nearing the end of the Great Depression, the American economy began to slowly strengthen. Dwane Wallace (founder Clyde Cessna's nephew who was a recent college graduate in aeronautical engineering) decided to assist his uncle and cousin, Eldon Cessna (Clyde's son), in building more modern airplanes for Cessna Aircraft. The design of the first Airmaster is credited to Wallace, and the first flight of the C-34 model was in June 1935. Not long after introduction of the C-34, Clyde Cessna retired from the aircraft industry, leaving the company to his nephew.

Later models
The original Airmaster, the C-34, evolved into more advanced versions of the Airmaster. The C-37 had a wider cabin, improved landing gear and electric flaps. The C-38 had a taller vertical tail, curved main gear legs and a landing flap under the fuselage.  Changes common to both the C-37 and C-38 included wider fuselages and landing gear along with rubber engine mounts to hold the  Warner Super Scarab engine. The final revisions of the C-34 were the C-145 and the C-165, of which 80 were built.  On these models, the belly flaps added on the C-38 were removed and the overall length of the fuselage was increased.  The only difference between the C-145 and C-165 was the engine horsepower, with the latter having an upgraded  Warner engine.

End of the line
It was with the beginning of World War II that the Airmaster line came to an end.  The welded tubular fuselage, fabric-covered body, extensive woodwork, wooden wings and radial engines, all characteristic of 1930s-era aircraft technology, became too expensive and slow to produce.  The old-style aircraft was quickly replaced with aircraft constructed from aluminium with strut braced wings first seen in the Cessna 120.

Design
The design of the C-34 incorporates characteristics that were borrowed from previous models of Cessna Aircraft.  These similarities include the high mounted cantilever wing and the narrow design of the cabin windows.  The wings and tail surfaces were composed entirely of wood while the fuselage was structured with steel tubing coupled with wooden stringers and formers.  Both C-145 and C-165 models were offered with floats.

Variants 
C-34 Four-seat light cabin aircraft, powered by a 145-hp (108-kW) Warner Super Scarab radial piston engine; 42 built.
C-37 Cabin widened by 12.7 cm (5 in), fitted with improved landing gear and electrically operated flaps; 46 built.
C-38 Fitted with wide landing gear with curved legs, plus a taller vertical tail and a landing flap under the fuselage; 16 built.
C-39 Original designation of the Cessna C-145.
C-145 Powered by a 145-hp (108-kW) Warner Super Scarab radial piston engine.
C-165 Powered by a 165-hp (123-kW) Warner Super Scarab radial piston engine.
C-165D Powered by a 175-hp (130-kW) Warner Super Scarab radial piston engine.
UC-77B Two Cessna C-34s impressed into service with the United States Army Air Forces (USAAF) during World War II.
UC-77C One Cessna C-37 impressed into service with the USAAF in 1942.
UC-77D Four Cessna C-37s impressed into service with the USAAF in 1942.
UC-94 Three Cessna C-165s impressed into service with the USAAF in 1942.

Operators

Military operators 

Royal Australian Air Force

Finnish Air Force

United States Army Air Forces

Survivors
As of December 31, 2006, there are 69 aircraft in the FAA database with the listed Models (totals) being C-165 (30), C-145 (10), C-34 (8), C-37 (14), and C-38 (7).

Specifications

See also

References
Notes

Bibliography

External links

Article on the Airmaster
 "Cessna's Past 'Masters", May 1974 American Aircraft Modeler

165
1930s United States civil utility aircraft
High-wing aircraft
Single-engined tractor aircraft
Aircraft first flown in 1935